In Pursuit of Magic is a live album by American jazz saxophonist Roscoe Mitchell with drummer  Mike Reed which was recorded in 2013 and released on 482 Music.

Reception
In his review for the Chicago Reader, Bill Meyer states, "Mitchell shifts adroitly between several saxophones and flutes, using Reed’s surging tempos, sensitive brushwork, and varying density of attack as a launching pad and backdrop for extraordinarily long, convoluted linear forays full of tension and surprise"

Track listing
All compositions by Roscoe Mitchell and Mike Reed
 "Constellations Over Denmark" – 21:03
 "Light Can Bend" – 24:59

Personnel
Roscoe Mitchell - saxophone, flute
Mike Reed – drums, percussion

References

2014 live albums
Roscoe Mitchell live albums